"The Phone Message" is the ninth episode of the NBC sitcom Seinfeld, and the fourth of the show's second season. The episode concerns protagonist Jerry Seinfeld (Jerry Seinfeld) dating a woman who likes a commercial for cotton Dockers he dislikes. Meanwhile, his friend George Costanza (Jason Alexander) leaves an obnoxious message on the answering machine of his girlfriend, and goes to great lengths to prevent her from hearing it.

Written by series co-creators Seinfeld and Larry David and directed by Tom Cherones, the episode was produced to replace a script by staff writer Larry Charles. Charles had written an episode called "The Bet," revolving around Elaine Benes (Julia Louis-Dreyfus) buying a handgun. The script's gun content was deemed too provocative and, in little time, Seinfeld and David wrote "The Phone Message" to fill the production void. Though the episode was met with positive critical responses, its initial broadcast on February 13, 1991, was watched by an underwhelming audience of 13 million viewers, causing NBC to put the show on a two-month hiatus.

Plot
George is excited when he learns that he and Jerry are having dates on the same night. Both of their dates go well up to the point that they have to say goodnight. George's date Carol (Tory Polone) asks George to come up to her place for some coffee, but George tells her that he can't drink coffee at night because it "keeps [him] up." Once she leaves his car, he realizes he made a mistake as "coffee" is a euphemism for sex. Jerry's date Donna (Gretchen German) remarks that she likes a cotton Dockers commercial that Jerry absolutely hates, and with that ends his interest in her.

George decides to call Carol, but gets her answering machine. He leaves her an extremely long, obnoxious message and is concerned that she will think he is an idiot. Jerry's friend Elaine Benes (Julia Louis-Dreyfus) tells George that something similar happened to her brother-in-law, who took care of the problem by secretly switching the tape. Jerry advises George to wait a few days for Carol to call back; George agrees, but continues to leave increasingly angry — and eventually almost hostile — messages on her machine. When he discovers she was out of town, he decides to go through with the plan of changing the tape. Frustrated by his inability to use an answering machine, George convinces Jerry to go with him. They decide to wait for Carol outside her apartment, and George will distract her while Jerry changes the tape. They succeed, but, just as they are about to leave Carol's apartment, she tells George that she had already heard the messages and found them funny, adding that she "loves jokes like that."

Production

"The Bet"
Staff writer Larry Charles had written a script for an episode titled "The Bet." In the episode, which was also known as "The Gun," Elaine would bet against Jerry on the ease of buying a handgun to protect herself. The episode's subplot revolved around Jerry's neighbor Kramer returning from a vacation in Puerto Rico, claiming he had sex with a stewardess on his flight home. George and Jerry would remain skeptical and make a bet with him; eventually, George, Jerry and Elaine would go to the airport to check if Kramer was telling the truth. In writing "The Bet," Charles had attempted to make a "funny, dark-themed" episode. Sets for the episode were built. Bobbi Jo Lathan was cast as flight attendant Lucy Merrit and Ernie Sabella was cast as gun salesman Mo Korn, who was described in the script as "overweight, greasy, slow and low-key."

However, during the read-through of the episode, it was negatively received by cast and crew members; both Alexander and director Tom Cherones felt the episode's gun content was too provocative. When she read a scene that referenced the assassinations of John F. Kennedy and William McKinley, Louis-Dreyfus turned to Alexander and stated, "I'm not gonna do this." Though they did not want to, the cast started rehearsing. After 20 minutes they convinced Cherones to talk to Charles. On his way to Charles' office, Cherones bumped into NBC executive Glenn Padnick, with whom he talked to Charles, eventually agreeing not to film the episode. Commenting on the episode, Charles stated "You know, it would have been an interesting show, but  we couldn't solve the funny problem of it. It never seemed to quite be as funny as it should be and, because of that, the balance was off and the darkness kind of enveloped it, and it could never really emerge from that darkness and become what it should have been. So, it was disappointing but also understandable."

Both Lathan and Sabella were given roles in later episodes; Lathan appeared as Patti in the season three episode "The Stranded," while Sabella was cast as the "greasy naked guy" in "The Subway," also for the show's third season.

"The Phone Message"
Series co-creator Larry David co-wrote the episode with Seinfeld in two days, as they had little time to write the script due to the cancellation of "The Bet." George's storyline was largely based on David's personal experiences of leaving phone messages to women that would cause the end of a relationship. David had previously written a sketch for Saturday Night Live regarding a man who went into his girlfriend's house to erase her answering machine. The sketch was never produced, allowing David to use its storyline for the Seinfeld episode. Jerry's storyline was based on Seinfeld's own predicaments, as he extremely disliked the cotton Dockers commercial discussed in the episode.

A few changes were made to the first few drafts of the script. Additional dialogue between George and Jerry regarding dates during the 1850s was removed for timing purposes. During his date with Donna, Jerry would mention his remark about ponies in the earlier episode "The Pony Remark," but this was later changed to a remark about leaving a note when committing suicide. Initially, Kramer's first name was revealed in the episode; though the information was removed from the eventual script, the idea of revealing Kramer's first name would be further exploited in the season six episode "The Switch."

Gretchen German was cast as Jerry's date Donna. Gina Hecht, who would go on to portray George's psychiatrist Dana Foley during the show's fourth season, also auditioned for the part. Tory Polone, who portrayed George's date Carol, had previously appeared in the 1989 television films When We Were Young and Sparks. The episode was first read by the cast on Friday, December 14, 1990. Table reads usually took place on Wednesdays, but the read-through of "The Bet" had been held on December 12. Directed by Cherones, as were all other episodes of the second season, "The Phone Message" was filmed in front of a live audience on December 19, 1990. Jerry's stand-up routine had been filmed one day earlier.

Reception
The episode was first broadcast in the United States on February 13, 1991, on NBC. "The Phone Message" received a Nielsen rating of 9.7 and an audience share of 15, indicating that 9.7% of American households watched the episode, and that 15% of all televisions in use at the time were tuned into it. Nielsen Media Research also estimated that approximately 13 million American viewers watched the episode, making it the 59th most-watched show of the week it was broadcast in. Disappointed with the ratings, as earlier episodes had averaged between 19 and 22 million viewers each, the network put the show on a two-month hiatus. When the series returned in its original timeslot behind Cheers, its high ratings and increasing popularity led NBC to order the full season.

"The Phone Message" gained positive responses from critics. Jerry's dumping Donna because she likes the commercial has been frequently cited as an example of how the show's central characters would often break up with people for "fantastically insignificant reasons." In a 1998 article, the staff of South Carolina newspaper The State cited "The Phone Message" as "the first episode that made an impression on [them]," referring to Seinfeld as "the comedic version of Hill Street Blues." Entertainment Weekly critics Mike Flaherty and Mary Kaye Schilling graded the episode with a B+, calling it "the first of two consecutive and classic George angst-fests, as Jason Alexander—master of frantic venom—begins to make the character his own."

References

External links

Seinfeld (season 2) episodes
1991 American television episodes
Television episodes written by Larry David
Television episodes written by Jerry Seinfeld